Pilipović is a surname of South Slavic origin, a patronymic of the given name Pilip.

It may refer to:

 Borislav Pilipović (born 1984), Bosnian-Herzegovinian football player
 Kristian Pilipovic (born 1994), Croatian-born Austrian handball player
 Renato Pilipović (born 1977), Croatian football player and coach
 Stevan Pilipović (born 1950), Serbian mathematician
 Stojan Pilipović (born 1987), Serbian football player
 Tamara Pilipović (born 1990), Serbian politician

See also
 Pilipovich
 Filipović

Croatian surnames
Serbian surnames
Patronymic surnames
Surnames from given names